Customs is a six-part Irish documentary television series that examines the role of customs officers, focusing on their daily lives and their regular encounters with the illegal drug trade and other difficult situations. The series began airing on 14 September 2008 and concluded on 19 October 2008.

The series makers accessed customs officers' daily operations, allowing viewers to see the way the authorities deal with the importation of illegal substances. The series focuses on customs officers at Dublin Airport and Dublin Port as they target cigarette smuggling and illegal drug trade.

Episodes
Six episodes aired between 14 September and 19 October 2008.

Broadcast 
The series aired in Ireland on RTÉ One on Sunday evenings at 7:30pm from 14 September 2008. The series was broadcast in the UK on Pick TV in 2011.

References

External links
 Official website

2008 Irish television series debuts
Irish documentary television series
RTÉ original programming
2008 Irish television series endings
Television series about border control